= Euaissa =

Town of ancient Cappadocia

Coordinates: 39°18′43″N 35°06′35″E

Euaissa was a town of ancient Cappadocia, inhabited in Byzantine times.

Its site is tentatively located near Yoğunhisar, Asiatic Turkey.
